what3words is a proprietary geocode system designed to identify any location on the surface of the earth with a resolution of about . It is owned by What3words Limited, based in London, England. The system encodes geographic coordinates into three permanently fixed dictionary words.

What3words differs from most location encoding systems in that it uses words rather than strings of numbers or letters, and the pattern of this mapping is not obvious; the algorithm mapping locations to words is protected by copyright.

The company has a website, apps for iOS and Android, and an API for bidirectional conversion between what3words addresses and latitude/longitude coordinates.

History
Founded by Chris Sheldrick, Jack Waley-Cohen, Mohan Ganesalingam and Michael Dent, what3words was launched in July 2013. Sheldrick and Ganesalingam conceived the idea when Sheldrick, working as an event organizer, struggled to get bands and equipment to music venues using inadequate address information. Sheldrick tried using GPS coordinates to locate the venues, but decided that words were better than numbers after a one-digit error led him to the wrong location. He credits a mathematician friend for the idea of dividing the world into  squares, and the linguist Jack Waley-Cohen with using memorable words. The company was incorporated in March 2013 and a patent application for the core technology filed in April 2013. In November 2013, What3words raised $500,000 of seed funding.

In January 2018, Mercedes-Benz bought approximately 10% of the company and announced support for What3words in future versions of the Mercedes-Benz User Experience infotainment and navigation system.

In 2018, the company had a turnover of £274,000 and lost £11M. In the year ending December 2019, the company lost £14.5M and had reported assets of £24.7M. By January 2020, the company had reached 100 employees and raised over £50M from investors. In the year ending December 2020, the company lost £16.09M. In the year ending December 2021, the company lost £43.29M.

In March 2021, it was announced that ITV plc had invested £2 million in What3words as the first investment in its media-for-equity scheme.

Users

Emergency services 

Since 2019, What3words has seen adoption by emergency services, who can use it for free and frequently promote the app on social media. As of September 2021, more than 85 per cent of British emergency services teams use What3words, including the Metropolitan Police and London Fire Brigade. Support has also been added to the Australian Government's Triple Zero Emergency Plus App.

 In September 2019, the Scottish Ambulance Service used the app to share the location of an injured hillwalker with the coastguard. 
 In February 2020, Ambulance Tasmania sent a link to locate an injured bushwalker.
 In October 2020, Singapore Police Force asked two lost 14-year-old boys to download and use the app.
 In July 2022, Baldwin County dispatchers used the app to pinpoint a capsized kayaker, with responders saying that they "were within 50 yards and couldn't see him because of the conditions in the water".
 In August 2022, Tröstau Fire Brigade used the app to communicate a location to the Wunsiedel mountain rescue service.
 In September 2022, Halton emergency services located an injured climber using the app.

Automotive

The Mercedes A-Class, launched in May 2018, became the first vehicle in the world with What3words on board.

Logistics

In 2015, the company was targeting logistics companies, post offices, and couriers.

OneWord

What3words originally sold "OneWord" addresses, which were stored in a database for a yearly fee, but this offering was discontinued as the company switched to a business-to-business model.

Design

Wordlists 
What3words divides the world into a grid of 57 trillion  squares, each of which has a three-word address. The company says they do their best to remove homophones and spelling variations; however, at least 32 pairs of English near-homophones still remain.

Wordlists are available in 50 languages, each of which uses a list of 25,000 words (except for English, which uses 40,000 to cover sea as well as land). Translations are not direct, as direct translations to some languages could produce more than three words. Rather, territories are localised "considering linguistic sensitivities and nuances". Densely populated areas have strings of short words to aid more frequent usage; while less populated areas, such as the North Atlantic, use more complex words.

In a 2019 blog, open standards advocate and technology expert Terence Eden questioned the cultural neutrality of using words rather than the numbers generated by map coordinates. "Numbers are (mostly) culturally neutral." he said, "Words are not. Is mile.crazy.shade a respectful name for a war memorial? How about tribes.hurt.stumpy for a temple?"

Ambiguity 
What3words state that similar addresses are spaced as far apart as possible to avoid confusion, and that similarly sounding codes have a 1 in 2.5 million chance of pointing to locations near each other.

However, security researcher Andrew Tierney calculates that 75% of What3words addresses contain plural words that also exist in singular form (or the reverse). Co-founder and CEO Sheldrick responded that "Whilst the overwhelming proportion of similar-sounding three-word combinations will be so far apart that an error is obvious, there will still be cases where similar sounding word combinations are nearby."

Further analysis by Tierney shows that in the London area, around 1 in 24 addresses will be confusable with another London address.

In September 2022, the Department of Culture, Media and Sport used What3words to direct mourners to the end of the queue to view the Queen lying in state in London. Of the first five codes published, four led to the wrong place, including a suburb of London some 15 miles from the real end of the queue. Officials later moved to an automated system to generate the identifiers, as they realised having people involved in the process resulted in typos.

Reception 
According to Rory Sutherland from the advertising agency Ogilvy in a 2014 op-ed piece for The Spectator, the system's advantages are memorability, accuracy, and non-ambiguity in speech.

Mountain rescue 
Mountain rescue services in the UK have warned against relying on the app:

 In December 2019, the Lake District Search & Mountain Rescue Association noted that "mishearing or misspelling words tended to cause problems" and warned hikers not to rely on it.
 In June 2021, Mountain Rescue England and Wales raised concerns about the credibility of reported What3words coordinates, following incorrect information being given about 45 locations over 12 months. Spelling issues and local accents were reported as being part of the problem.

Open standards 
Supporters of open standards criticise the What3words system for being controlled by a private business and the software for being patented and not freely usable.

The company has pursued an assertive policy of issuing copyright claims against individuals and organisations that have hosted or published files of the What3words algorithm or reverse-engineered code that replicates the service's functionality, such as the free and open source implementation WhatFreeWords. The whatfreewords.org website was subsequently taken down following a Digital Millennium Copyright Act (DMCA) take-down notice issued by What3words. This has extended to removing comments on social media which refer to unauthorised versions. In late April 2021, a security researcher was subjected to the threat of a lawsuit from What3words, stating that linking to the open source reimplementation "WhatFreeWords" violates the company's copyright. "The letter also demanded that he disclose to the [company's lawyers] the identity of the person or people with whom he had shared a copy of the software, agree that he would not make any further copies of the software and to delete any copies of the software he had in his possession."

Parody 
The site has been parodied by others who have created services including What3Emojis using emojis, What3Birds using British birds, What3fucks using swear words, Four King Maps also using swear words (covering only the British Isles), and What3Numbers using OpenStreetMap tile identifiers.

Awards 
 Grand Prix for Innovation at the 2015 Cannes Lions International Festival of Creativity 
 The Tech Awards 2015 Sobrato Organization Economic Development Award

See also

References

Geocodes
Internet properties established in 2013
Companies based in London